The FEI World Cup Jumping 2011/2012 is the 34th edition of the premier international show jumping competition run by the FEI. The final is held at the 's-Hertogenbosch, Netherlands from April 18, 2012 to April 22, 2012. Christian Ahlmann of Germany is the defending champion, having won the final the previous year (2010/11) in Leipzig, Germany.

First time ever a Chinese League is held. In the Japan League the horse show in Minamisōma was replaced by a horse show in Mito as a result of the Fukushima Daiichi nuclear disaster.

Arab League

Caucasian League

Central Asian League

Central European League

North Sub-League

South Sub-League

Final

Chinese League

Japan League

North American League

East Coast

West Coast

Pacific League

Australia

New Zealand

South African League

South American League

South East Asia League

Western European League

World Cup Final

References

 show jumping result search of the International Federation of Equestrian Sports

External links
Official website
Complete event schedule

2011 2012
2011 in show jumping
2012 in show jumping